Cirrhilabrus sanguineus, the red-blotched fairy-wrasse, is a species of wrasse native to the coral reefs of the Mauritius. It can be found in the aquarium trade.

References

sanguineus
Fish described in 1987
Endemic fauna of Mauritius